Çamlıca (former Muhallar) is a village in Karaman Province, Turkey

Its population was 500 as of 2009.

References

Villages in Ermenek District